Howard is a village in Brown and Outagamie counties in the U.S. state of Wisconsin. The population was 17,399 at the 2010 census. It is part of the Green Bay Metropolitan Statistical Area.

The village is mostly within Brown County; a small portion extends west into Outagamie County. It is bordered to the east by Green Bay, a sub-basin of Lake Michigan. Prior to being incorporated as the Village of Howard, the Town of Howard was commonly referred to as "Duck Creek" because of the Duck Creek waterway winding its way through the village.

History
The Green Bay area was first explored by Europeans in 1634, when Jean Nicolet, a French voyager, arrived in the area. The Town of Howard was established in 1835 and slowly developed along the Duck Creek as a center for mail delivery, farming, quarrying and lumbering. By 1848, there were three major railroads that convergen in Howard, the Chicago & North Western (C&NW), the SOO Line (SOO) And the Milwaukee Road (MILW). It was named for Brigadier General Benjamin Howard, an officer in the War of 1812.

By 1856, a school was operating and the Town of Howard became known for its Duck Creek stone quarries; of which there were four. The last of the quarries were shut down in 2002, with one being converted into a swimming hole, and a community gathering place. Another was turned into a restaurant. One of the quarries had a lumber mill nearby, and after countless decades of timber dumping into the quarry, it is unsafe for swimmers and is now colored a very light yellow.

By 1959, the population had grown and the Town of Howard became incorporated as the Village of Howard. Residential, commercial and industrial growth has continued steadily since that time, creating a suburban community on Green Bay's northwest side. Today the only railroads that reach Green Bay are the Escanaba & Lake Superior (E&LS) and the Canadian National (CN). Two of the four original railroad yards have been removed or abandoned. The Fox River Valley (FRVR) Railroad yard, formerly the Green Bay & Western (GB&W), has been turned into a park and apartments. The Milwaukee Road (MILW) yard has had its tracks removed, but is still owned by Canadian National. It is planned to be converted to apartments. There are several different parks in Howard, that are open to the public. The Duck Creek Quarry Park is open to the public all year round. There are several nature parks open to recreation and sporting events; all but one are open year round.

Geography

Howard is located at  (44.563091, −88.081856).

Climate

Demographics

2010 census
As of the census of 2010, there were 17,399 people, 6,941 households, and 4,763 families living in the village. The racial makeup of the village was 93.8% White, 1.5% Black, 1.2% Native American, 1.3% Asian, 0.6% from other races, and 1.6% from two or more races. Hispanic or Latino of any race were 2.4% of the population.

There were 6,941 households, of which 37.0% had children under the age of 18 living with them, 52.9% were married couples living together, 10.9% had a female householder with no husband present, 4.8% had a male householder with no wife present, and 31.4% were non-families. 24.0% of all households were made up of individuals, and 8.2% had someone living alone who was 65 years of age or older. The average household size was 2.50 and the average family size was 2.98.

The median age in the village was 36.3 years. 26.7% of residents were under the age of 18; 7.9% were between the ages of 18 and 24; 28.5% were from 25 to 44; 26.1% were from 45 to 64; and 10.7% were 65 years of age or older. The gender makeup of the village was 48.3% male and 51.7% female.

2000 census
As of the census of 2000, there were 13,546 people, 5,236 households, and 3,691 families living in the village. The population density was 753.7 people per square mile (291.0/km2). There were 5,350 housing units at an average density of 297.7 per square mile (114.9/km2). The racial makeup of the village was 96.16% White, 0.73% African American, 0.90% Native American, 0.78% Asian, 0.01% Pacific Islander, 0.32% from other races, and 1.10% from two or more races. Hispanic or Latino of any race were 1.09% of the population.

There were 5,236 households, out of which 38.2% had children under the age of 18 living with them, 57.7% were married couples living together, 9.3% had a female householder with no husband present, and 29.5% were non-families. 21.7% of all households were made up of individuals, and 6.0% had someone living alone who was 65 years of age or older. The average household size was 2.57 and the average family size was 3.04.

In the village, the population was spread out, with 27.8% under the age of 18, 8.6% from 18 to 24, 34.8% from 25 to 44, 21.3% from 45 to 64, and 7.5% who were 65 years of age or older. The median age was 34 years. For every 100 females, there were 96.6 males. For every 100 females age 18 and over, there were 94.7 males.

The median income for a household in the village was $51,974, and the median income for a family was $56,579. Males had a median income of $40,081 versus $25,900 for females. The per capita income for the village was $21,688. About 3.2% of families and 4.3% of the population were below the poverty line, including 4.7% of those under age 18 and 3.7% of those age 65 or over.

Law and government

The Village of Howard has village president, a board of trustees, and a village administrator. The village president and board of trustees establish policies for the village and the village administrator oversees the day-to-day operations of the government. The village board meets twice monthly.

The village president is responsible for making appointments to boards and commissions and for chairing the village board meetings. The village board is responsible for establishing the tax rate, approving the budget, setting village policies, and establishing the strategic direction of the village.

Education
The village is served by the Howard-Suamico School District. There are also parochial Roman Catholic schools within the village.

Parks

The village of Howard has 21 parks, totaling several hundred acres.  Howard’s Memorial Park is the trail head of the Mountain Bay Trail, an -long trail that runs through three counties in northeastern Wisconsin.

Akzo Nobel Park contains four softball diamonds, ten soccer fields and an 18-hole disc golf course.

Meadowbrook Park is a  outdoor recreation area consisting of gently sloping open areas, wooded lowlands, wetlands and hills, and a paved  trail. The park also contains a lighted sledding hill, a fully fenced baseball diamond, an open-air shelter with grill, a full-size basketball court, and restrooms.

The Village of Howard also operates Village Green, a nine-hole, par 36 golf course that is fully irrigated.

Public safety

Police department
The Village of Howard does not have a police department of its own and contracts its law enforcement services from the Brown County Sheriff Department. The Village's main patrol station is located at Village Hall, in conjunction with the fire department.

Fire department
Howard has a paid on-call fire department, with a full-time public safety director and an assistant fire chief. The village contracts for emergency medical services (EMS) with a private emergency medical services company, Eagle III.

Transportation
The village is located at the intersection of Interstate 43, U.S. Highway 41, and State Highway 29. Interstate 43, which provides direct access to Milwaukee and Chicago, terminates in Howard. U.S. Highway 41 south of Interstate 43 was reclassified as an Interstate Highway in April 2015.

Notable people

 David Cooper Ayres, doctor had a practice there from 1865–1872, also a farm and a sawmill
 David Steffen, businessman and politician
 Carl Zoll, American Football player
 Martin Zoll, American Football player

Images

References

External links

 Village of Howard, Wisconsin
 

Villages in Wisconsin
Villages in Brown County, Wisconsin
Villages in Outagamie County, Wisconsin
Green Bay metropolitan area
Populated places established in 1835